The following is a List of awards and nominations received by Jon Bon Jovi throughout his career.

Academy Awards

|-
|1991
|"Blaze of Glory"
|Best Original Song
|
|}

ASCAP Latin Awards

|-
|2008
|"Como Yo Nadie Te Ha Amado"
|Pop/Ballad
|
|}

American Music Awards

|-
|1991
|"Blaze of Glory"
|Favorite Pop/Rock Song
|
|}

Arena Football League

|-
|2008
|ArenaBowl XXII
|Foster Trophy (as owner of the Philadelphia Soul)
|Philadelphia Soul 59 – San Jose SaberCats 56
|}

Brit Awards

|-
|1991
|rowspan="2"|Himself
|rowspan="2"|International Male Solo Artist
|
|-
|1998
|
|}

Grammy Awards

|-
|rowspan="2"|1991
|rowspan="2"|"Blaze of Glory"
|Best Male Rock Vocal Performance
|
|-
|Best Song Written for Visual Media
|
|}

Golden Globe Awards

|-
|1991
|"Blaze of Glory"
|rowspan="2"|Best Original Song
|
|-
|2012
|"Not Running Anymore"
|
|}

MTV Europe Music Awards

|-
|1997
|Himself
|Best Male
|
|}

MTV Video Music Awards

|-
|rowspan="2"|1991
|rowspan="2"|"Blaze of Glory"
|Best Male Video
|
|-
|Best Video from a Film
|
|}

Rock and Roll Hall of Fame

|-
|2018
|Himself
|Inductee
|
|}

Songwriters Hall of Fame

|-
|2009
|Himself
|Inductee
|
|}

References

Bon Jovi, Jon
Awards